Norway, officially the Kingdom of Norway, is a Nordic country in Northern Europe, the mainland territory of which comprises the western and northernmost portion of the Scandinavian Peninsula. The remote Arctic island of Jan Mayen and the archipelago of Svalbard also form part of Norway. Bouvet Island, located in the Subantarctic, is a dependency of Norway; it also lays claims to the Antarctic territories of Peter I Island and Queen Maud Land. The capital and largest city in Norway is Oslo.

It is bordered by Finland and Russia to the northeast and the Skagerrak strait to the south, on the other side of which are Denmark and the United Kingdom. Norway has an extensive coastline, facing the North Atlantic Ocean and the Barents Sea. The maritime influence dominates Norway's climate, with mild lowland temperatures on the sea coasts; the interior, while colder, is also significantly milder than areas elsewhere in the world on such northerly latitudes. Even during polar night in the north, temperatures above freezing are commonplace on the coastline. The maritime influence brings high rainfall and snowfall to some areas of the country.

Harald V of the House of Glücksburg is the current King of Norway. Jonas Gahr Støre has been prime minister since 2021, replacing Erna Solberg. As a unitary sovereign state with a constitutional monarchy, Norway divides state power between the parliament, the cabinet and the supreme court, as determined by the 1814 constitution. The kingdom was established in 872 as a merger of many petty kingdoms and has existed continuously for 1, years. From 1537 to 1814, Norway was a part of the Kingdom of Denmark–Norway, and, from 1814 to 1905, it was in a personal union with the Kingdom of Sweden. Norway was neutral during the First World War, and also in World War II until April 1940 when the country was invaded and occupied by Nazi Germany until the end of the war.

Norway has both administrative and political subdivisions on two levels: counties and municipalities. The Sámi people have a certain amount of self-determination and influence over traditional territories through the Sámi Parliament and the Finnmark Act. Norway maintains close ties with both the European Union and the United States. Norway is also a founding member of the United Nations, NATO, the European Free Trade Association, the Council of Europe, the Antarctic Treaty, and the Nordic Council; a member of the European Economic Area, the WTO, and the OECD; and a part of the Schengen Area. In addition, the Norwegian languages share mutual intelligibility with Danish and Swedish.

Norway maintains the Nordic welfare model with universal health care and a comprehensive social security system, and its values are rooted in egalitarian ideals. The Norwegian state has large ownership positions in key industrial sectors, having extensive reserves of petroleum, natural gas, minerals, lumber, seafood, and fresh water. The petroleum industry accounts for around a quarter of the country's gross domestic product (GDP). On a per-capita basis, Norway is the world's largest producer of oil and natural gas outside of the Middle East.

The country has the fourth-highest per-capita income in the world on the World Bank and IMF lists. On the CIA's GDP (PPP) per capita list (2015 estimate) which includes autonomous territories and regions, Norway ranks as number eleven. It has the world's largest sovereign wealth fund, with a value of US$1 trillion. Norway has the second highest Human Development Index ranking in the world, previously holding the top position between 2001 and 2006, and between 2009 and 2019; it also has the second highest inequality-adjusted ranking per 2021. Norway ranked first on the World Happiness Report for 2017 and currently ranks first on the OECD Better Life Index, the Index of Public Integrity, the Freedom Index, and the Democracy Index. Norway also has one of the lowest crime rates in the world.

Although the majority of Norway's population is ethnic Norwegian, in the 21st century immigration has accounted for more than half of population growth; in 2021, the five largest minority groups in the country were the descendants of Polish, Lithuanian, Somali, Pakistani, and Swedish immigrants.

Etymology 

Norway has two official names: Norge in Bokmål and Noreg in Nynorsk. The English name Norway comes from the Old English word Norþweg mentioned in 880, meaning "northern way" or "way leading to the north", which is how the Anglo-Saxons referred to the coastline of Atlantic Norway similar to leading theory about the origin of the Norwegian language name. The Anglo-Saxons of Britain also referred to the kingdom of Norway in 880 as Norðmanna land.

There is some disagreement about whether the native name of Norway originally had the same etymology as the English form. According to the traditional dominant view, the first component was originally norðr, a cognate of English north, so the full name was Norðr vegr, "the way northwards", referring to the sailing route along the Norwegian coast, and contrasting with suðrvegar "southern way" (from Old Norse suðr) for (Germany), and austrvegr "eastern way" (from austr) for the Baltic. In the translation of Orosius for Alfred, the name is Norðweg, while in younger Old English sources the ð is gone. In the tenth century many Norsemen settled in Northern France, according to the sagas, in the area that was later called Normandy from norðmann (Norseman or Scandinavian), although not a Norwegian possession. In France normanni or northmanni referred to people of Norway, Sweden or Denmark. Until around 1800, inhabitants of Western Norway were referred to as nordmenn (northmen) while inhabitants of Eastern Norway were referred to as austmenn (eastmen).

According to another theory, the first component was a word nór, meaning "narrow" (Old English nearu), referring to the inner-archipelago sailing route through the land ("narrow way"). The interpretation as "northern", as reflected in the English and Latin forms of the name, would then have been due to later folk etymology. This latter view originated with philologist Niels Halvorsen Trønnes in 1847; since 2016 it is also advocated by language student and activist Klaus Johan Myrvoll and was adopted by philology professor Michael Schulte. The form Nore is still used in placenames such as the village of Nore and lake Norefjorden in Buskerud county, and still has the same meaning. Among other arguments in favour of the theory, it is pointed out that the word has a long vowel in Skaldic poetry and is not attested with <ð> in any native Norse texts or inscriptions (the earliest runic attestations have the spellings nuruiak and nuriki). This resurrected theory has received some pushback by other scholars on various grounds, e. g. the uncontroversial presence of the element norðr in the ethnonym norðrmaðr "Norseman, Norwegian person" (modern Norwegian nordmann), and the adjective norrǿnn "northern, Norse, Norwegian", as well as the very early attestations of the Latin and Anglo-Saxon forms with <th>.

In a Latin manuscript of 840, the name Northuagia is mentioned. King Alfred's edition of the Orosius World History (dated 880), uses the term Norðweg. A French chronicle of c. 900 uses the names Northwegia and Norwegia. When Ohthere of Hålogaland visited King Alfred the Great in England in the end of the ninth century, the land was called Norðwegr (lit. "Northway") and norðmanna land (lit. "Northmen's land"). According to Ohthere, Norðmanna lived along the Atlantic coast, the Danes around Skagerrak og Kattegat, while the Sámi people (the "Fins") had a nomadic lifestyle in the wide interior. Ohthere told Alfred that he was "the most northern of all Norwegians", presumably at Senja island or closer to Tromsø. He also said that beyond the wide wilderness in Norway's southern part was the land of the Swedes, "Svealand".

The adjective Norwegian, recorded from c. 1600, is derived from the latinisation of the name as Norwegia; in the adjective Norwegian, the Old English spelling '-weg' has survived.

After Norway had become Christian, Noregr and Noregi had become the most common forms, but during the 15th century, the newer forms Noreg(h) and Norg(h)e, found in medieval Icelandic manuscripts, took over and have survived until the modern day.

History

Prehistory 

The first inhabitants were the Ahrensburg culture (11th to 10th millennia BC), which was a late Upper Paleolithic culture during the Younger Dryas, the last period of cold at the end of the Weichselian glaciation. The earliest traces of human occupation in Norway are found along the coast, where the huge ice shelf of the last ice age first melted between 11,000 and 8,000 BC. The oldest finds are stone tools dating from 9,500 to 6,000 BC, discovered in Finnmark (Komsa culture) in the north and Rogaland (Fosna culture) in the southwest. However, theories about two altogether different cultures (the Komsa culture north of the Arctic Circle being one and the Fosna culture from Trøndelag to Oslofjord being the other) were rendered obsolete in the 1970s.

More recent finds along the entire coast revealed to archaeologists that the difference between the two can simply be ascribed to different types of tools and not to different cultures. Coastal fauna provided a means of livelihood for fishermen and hunters, who may have made their way along the southern coast about 10,000 BC when the interior was still covered with ice. It is now thought that these so-called "Arctic" peoples came from the south and followed the coast northward considerably later.

In the southern part of the country are dwelling sites dating from about 5,000 BC. Finds from these sites give a clearer idea of the life of the hunting and fishing peoples. The implements vary in shape and mostly are made of different kinds of stone; those of later periods are more skilfully made. Rock carvings (i.e. petroglyphs) have been found, usually near hunting and fishing grounds. They represent game such as deer, reindeer, elk, bears, birds, seals, whales, and fish (especially salmon and halibut), all of which were vital to the way of life of the coastal peoples. The rock carvings at Alta in Finnmark, the largest in Scandinavia, were made at sea level from 4,200 to 500 BC and mark the progression of the land as the sea rose after the last ice age ended.

Bronze Age 

Between 3000 and 2500 BC, new settlers (Corded Ware culture) arrived in eastern Norway. They were Indo-European farmers who grew grain and kept cows and sheep. The hunting-fishing population of the west coast was also gradually replaced by farmers, though hunting and fishing remained useful secondary means of livelihood.

From about 1500 BC, bronze was gradually introduced, but the use of stone implements continued; Norway had few riches to barter for bronze goods, and the few finds consist mostly of elaborate weapons and brooches that only chieftains could afford. Huge burial cairns built close to the sea as far north as Harstad and also inland in the south are characteristic of this period. The motifs of the rock carvings differ slightly from those typical of the Stone Age. Representations of the Sun, animals, trees, weapons, ships, and people are all strongly stylised.

Thousands of rock carvings from this period depict ships, and the large stone burial monuments known as stone ships, suggest that ships and seafaring played an important role in the culture at large. The depicted ships most likely represent sewn plank built canoes used for warfare, fishing and trade. These ship types may have their origin as far back as the neolithic period and they continue into the Pre-Roman Iron Age, as exemplified by the Hjortspring boat.

Iron Age 

Little has been found dating from the early Iron Age (the last 500 years BC). The dead were cremated, and their graves contain few burial goods. During the first four centuries AD, the people of Norway were in contact with Roman-occupied Gaul. About 70 Roman bronze cauldrons, often used as burial urns, have been found. Contact with the civilised countries farther south brought a knowledge of runes; the oldest known Norwegian runic inscription dates from the third century. At this time, the amount of settled area in the country increased, a development that can be traced by coordinated studies of topography, archaeology, and place-names. The oldest root names, such as nes, vik, and bø ("cape," "bay," and "farm"), are of great antiquity, dating perhaps from the Bronze Age, whereas the earliest of the groups of compound names with the suffixes vin ("meadow") or heim ("settlement"), as in Bjǫrgvin (Bergen) or Sǿheim (Seim), usually date from the first century AD.

Archaeologists first made the decision to divide the Iron Age of Northern Europe into distinct pre-Roman and Roman Iron Ages after Emil Vedel unearthed a number of Iron Age artefacts in 1866 on the island of Bornholm. They did not exhibit the same permeating Roman influence seen in most other artefacts from the early centuries AD, indicating that parts of northern Europe had not yet come into contact with the Romans at the beginning of the Iron Age.

Migration period 

The destruction of the Western Roman Empire by the Germanic peoples in the fifth century is characterised by rich finds, including tribal chiefs' graves containing magnificent weapons and gold objects. Hill forts were built on precipitous rocks for defence. These houses were family homesteads where several generations lived together, with people and cattle under one roof.

These states were based on either clans or tribes (e.g., the Horder of Hordaland in western Norway). By the ninth century, each of these small states had things (local or regional assemblies) for negotiating and settling disputes. The thing meeting places, each eventually with a hörgr (open-air sanctuary) or a heathen hof (temple; literally "hill"), were usually situated on the oldest and best farms, which belonged to the chieftains and wealthiest farmers. The regional things united to form even larger units: assemblies of deputy yeomen from several regions. In this way, the lagting (assemblies for negotiations and lawmaking) developed. The Gulating had its meeting place by Sognefjord and may have been the centre of an aristocratic confederation along the western fjords and islands called the Gulatingslag. The Frostating was the assembly for the leaders in the Trondheimsfjord area; the Earls of Lade, near Trondheim, seem to have enlarged the Frostatingslag by adding the coastland from Romsdalsfjord to Lofoten.

Viking Age 

From the eighth to the tenth century, the wider Scandinavian region was the source of Vikings. The looting of the monastery at Lindisfarne in Northeast England in 793 by Norse people has long been regarded as the event which marked the beginning of the Viking Age. This age was characterised by expansion and emigration by Viking seafarers. They colonised, raided, and traded in all parts of Europe. Norwegian Viking explorers discovered Iceland by accident in the ninth century when heading for the Faroe Islands, and eventually came across Vinland, known today as Newfoundland, in Canada. The Vikings from Norway were most active in the northern and western British Isles and eastern North America isles.

According to tradition, Harald Fairhair unified them into one in 872 after the Battle of Hafrsfjord in Stavanger, thus becoming the first king of a united Norway. Harald's realm was mainly a South Norwegian coastal state. Fairhair ruled with a strong hand and according to the sagas, many Norwegians left the country to live in Iceland, the Faroe Islands, Greenland, and parts of Britain and Ireland. The modern-day Irish cities of Dublin, Limerick and Waterford were founded by Norwegian settlers.

Norse traditions were replaced slowly by Christian ones in the late 10th and early 11th centuries. One of the most important sources for the history of the 11th century Vikings is the treaty between the Icelanders and Olaf Haraldsson, king of Norway circa 1015 to 1028. This is largely attributed to the missionary kings Olav Tryggvasson and St. Olav. Haakon the Good was Norway's first Christian king, in the mid-10th century, though his attempt to introduce the religion was rejected. Born sometime in between 963 and 969, Olav Tryggvasson set off raiding in England with 390 ships. He attacked London during this raiding. Arriving back in Norway in 995, Olav landed in Moster. There he built a church which became the first Christian church ever built in Norway. From Moster, Olav sailed north to Trondheim where he was proclaimed King of Norway by the Eyrathing in 995.

Feudalism never really developed in Norway or Sweden, as it did in the rest of Europe. However, the administration of government took on a very conservative feudal character. The Hanseatic League forced the royalty to cede to them greater and greater concessions over foreign trade and the economy. The League had this hold over the royalty because of the loans the Hansa had made to the royalty and the large debt the kings were carrying. The League's monopolistic control over the economy of Norway put pressure on all classes, especially the peasantry, to the degree that no real burgher class existed in Norway.

Civil war and peak of power 

From the 1040s to 1130, the country was at peace. In 1130, the civil war era broke out on the basis of unclear succession laws, which allowed all the king's sons to rule jointly. For periods there could be peace, before a lesser son allied himself with a chieftain and started a new conflict. The Archdiocese of Nidaros was created in 1152 and attempted to control the appointment of kings. The church inevitably had to take sides in the conflicts, with the civil wars also becoming an issue regarding the church's influence of the king. The wars ended in 1217 with the appointment of Håkon Håkonsson, who introduced clear law of succession.

From 1000 to 1300, the population increased from 150,000 to 400,000, resulting both in more land being cleared and the subdivision of farms. While in the Viking Age all farmers owned their own land, by 1300, seventy percent of the land was owned by the king, the church, or the aristocracy. This was a gradual process which took place because of farmers borrowing money in poor times and not being able to repay. However, tenants always remained free men and the large distances and often scattered ownership meant that they enjoyed much more freedom than continental serfs. In the 13th century, about twenty percent of a farmer's yield went to the king, church and landowners.

The 14th century is described as Norway's Golden Age, with peace and increase in trade, especially with the British Islands, although Germany became increasingly important towards the end of the century. Throughout the High Middle Ages, the king established Norway as a sovereign state with a central administration and local representatives.

In 1349, the Black Death spread to Norway and had within a year killed a third of the population. Later plagues reduced the population to half the starting point by 1400. Many communities were entirely wiped out, resulting in an abundance of land, allowing farmers to switch to more animal husbandry. The reduction in taxes weakened the king's position, and many aristocrats lost the basis for their surplus, reducing some to mere farmers. High tithes to church made it increasingly powerful and the archbishop became a member of the Council of State.

The Hanseatic League took control over Norwegian trade during the 14th century and established a trading centre in Bergen. In 1380, Olaf Haakonsson inherited both the Norwegian and Danish thrones, creating a union between the two countries. In 1397, under Margaret I, the Kalmar Union was created between the three Scandinavian countries. She waged war against the Germans, resulting in a trade blockade and higher taxation on Norwegian goods, which resulted in a rebellion. However, the Norwegian Council of State was too weak to pull out of the union.

Margaret pursued a centralising policy which inevitably favoured Denmark, because it had a greater population than Norway and Sweden combined. Margaret also granted trade privileges to the Hanseatic merchants of Lübeck in Bergen in return for recognition of her right to rule, and these hurt the Norwegian economy. The Hanseatic merchants formed a state within a state in Bergen for generations. Even worse were the pirates, the "Victual Brothers", who launched three devastating raids on the port (the last in 1427).

Norway slipped ever more to the background under the Oldenburg dynasty (established 1448). There was one revolt under Knut Alvsson in 1502. Norwegians had some affection for King Christian II, who resided in the country for several years. Norway took no part in the events which led to Swedish independence from Denmark in the 1520s.

Kalmar Union 

Upon the death of Haakon V (King of Norway) in 1319, Magnus Erikson, at just three years old, inherited the throne as King Magnus VII of Norway. At the same time, a movement to make Magnus King of Sweden proved successful, and both the kings of Sweden and of Denmark were elected to the throne by their respective nobles, Thus, with his election to the throne of Sweden, both Sweden and Norway were united under King Magnus VII.

In 1349, the Black Death radically altered Norway, killing between 50% and 60% of its population and leaving it in a period of social and economic decline. The plague left Norway very poor. Although the death rate was comparable with the rest of Europe, economic recovery took much longer because of the small, scattered population. Even before the plague, the population was only about 500,000. After the plague, many farms lay idle while the population slowly increased. However, the few surviving farms' tenants found their bargaining positions with their landlords greatly strengthened.

King Magnus VII ruled Norway until 1350, when his son, Haakon, was placed on the throne as Haakon VI. In 1363, Haakon VI married Margaret, the daughter of King Valdemar IV of Denmark. Upon the death of Haakon VI, in 1379, his son, Olaf IV, was only 10 years old. Olaf had already been elected to the throne of Denmark on 3 May 1376. Thus, upon Olaf's accession to the throne of Norway, Denmark and Norway entered personal union. Olaf's mother and Haakon's widow, Queen Margaret, managed the foreign affairs of Denmark and Norway during the minority of Olaf IV.

Margaret was working toward a union of Sweden with Denmark and Norway by having Olaf elected to the Swedish throne. She was on the verge of achieving this goal when Olaf IV suddenly died. However, Denmark made Margaret temporary ruler upon the death of Olaf. On 2 February 1388, Norway followed suit and crowned Margaret. Queen Margaret knew that her power would be more secure if she were able to find a king to rule in her place. She settled on Eric of Pomerania, grandson of her sister. Thus at an all-Scandinavian meeting held at Kalmar, Erik of Pomerania was crowned king of all three Scandinavian countries. Thus, royal politics resulted in personal unions between the Nordic countries, eventually bringing the thrones of Norway, Denmark, and Sweden under the control of Queen Margaret when the country entered into the Kalmar Union.

Union with Denmark 

After Sweden broke out of the Kalmar Union in 1521, Norway tried to follow suit,  but the subsequent rebellion was defeated, and Norway remained in a union with Denmark until 1814, a total of 434 years. During the national romanticism of the 19th century, this period was by some referred to as the "400-Year Night", since all of the kingdom's royal, intellectual, and administrative power was centred in Copenhagen in Denmark. In fact, it was a period of great prosperity and progress for Norway, especially in terms of shipping and foreign trade, and it also secured the country's revival from the demographic catastrophe it suffered in the Black Death. Based on the respective natural resources, Denmark–Norway was in fact a very good match since Denmark supported Norway's needs for grain and food supplies, and Norway supplied Denmark with timber, metal, and fish.

With the introduction of Protestantism in 1536, the archbishopric in Trondheim was dissolved, and Norway lost its independence, and effectually became a colony of Denmark. The Church's incomes and possessions were instead redirected to the court in Copenhagen. Norway lost the steady stream of pilgrims to the relics of St. Olav at the Nidaros shrine, and with them, much of the contact with cultural and economic life in the rest of Europe.

Eventually restored as a kingdom (albeit in legislative union with Denmark) in 1661, Norway saw its land area decrease in the 17th century with the loss of the provinces Båhuslen, Jemtland, and Herjedalen to Sweden, as the result of a number of disastrous wars with Sweden. In the north, however, its territory was increased by the acquisition of the northern provinces of Troms and Finnmark, at the expense of Sweden and Russia.

The famine of 1695–1696 killed roughly 10% of Norway's population. The harvest failed in Scandinavia at least nine times between 1740 and 1800, with great loss of life.

Union with Sweden 

After Denmark–Norway was attacked by the United Kingdom at the 1807 Battle of Copenhagen, it entered into an alliance with Napoleon, with the war leading to dire conditions and mass starvation in 1812. As the Danish kingdom found itself on the losing side in 1814, it was forced, under terms of the Treaty of Kiel, to cede Norway to the king of Sweden, while the old Norwegian provinces of Iceland, Greenland, and the Faroe Islands remained with the Danish crown. Norway took this opportunity to declare independence, adopted a constitution based on American and French models, and elected the Crown Prince of Denmark and Norway, Christian Frederick, as king on 17 May 1814. This is the famous Syttende mai (Seventeenth of May) holiday celebrated by Norwegians and Norwegian-Americans alike. Syttende mai is also called Norwegian Constitution Day.

Norwegian opposition to the great powers' decision to link Norway with Sweden caused the Norwegian–Swedish War to break out as Sweden tried to subdue Norway by military means. As Sweden's military was not strong enough to defeat the Norwegian forces outright, and Norway's treasury was not large enough to support a protracted war, and as British and Russian navies blockaded the Norwegian coast, the belligerents were forced to negotiate the Convention of Moss. According to the terms of the convention, Christian Frederik abdicated the Norwegian throne and authorised the Parliament of Norway to make the necessary constitutional amendments to allow for the personal union that Norway was forced to accept. On 4 November 1814, the Parliament (Storting) elected Charles XIII of Sweden as king of Norway, thereby establishing the union with Sweden. Under this arrangement, Norway kept its liberal constitution and its own independent institutions, though it shared a common monarch and common foreign policy with Sweden. Following the recession caused by the Napoleonic Wars, economic development of Norway remained slow until economic growth began around 1830.

This period also saw the rise of the Norwegian romantic nationalism, as Norwegians sought to define and express a distinct national character. The movement covered all branches of culture, including literature (Henrik Wergeland [1808–1845], Bjørnstjerne Bjørnson [1832–1910], Peter Christen Asbjørnsen [1812–1845], Jørgen Moe [1813–1882]), painting (Hans Gude [1825–1903], Adolph Tidemand [1814–1876]), music (Edvard Grieg [1843–1907]), and even language policy, where attempts to define a native written language for Norway led to today's two official written forms for Norwegian: Bokmål and Nynorsk.

King Charles III John, who came to the throne of Norway and Sweden in 1818, was the second king following Norway's break from Denmark and the union with Sweden. Charles John was a complex man whose long reign extended to 1844. He protected the constitution and liberties of Norway and Sweden during the age of Metternich. As such, he was regarded as a liberal monarch for that age. However, he was ruthless in his use of paid informers, the secret police and restrictions on the freedom of the press to put down public movements for reform—especially the Norwegian national independence movement.

The Romantic Era that followed the reign of King Charles III John brought some significant social and political reforms. In 1854, women won the right to inherit property in their own right, just like men. In 1863, the last trace of keeping unmarried women in the status of minors was removed. Furthermore, women were then eligible for different occupations, particularly the common school teacher. By mid-century, Norway's democracy was limited; voting was limited to officials, property owners, leaseholders and burghers of incorporated towns.

Still, Norway remained a conservative society. Life in Norway (especially economic life) was "dominated by the aristocracy of professional men who filled most of the important posts in the central government". There was no strong bourgeosie class in Norway to demand a breakdown of this aristocratic control of the economy. Thus, even while revolution swept over most of the countries of Europe in 1848, Norway was largely unaffected by revolts that year.

Marcus Thrane was a Utopian socialist. He made his appeal to the labouring classes urging a change of social structure "from below upwards." In 1848, he organised a labour society in Drammen. In just a few months, this society had a membership of 500 and was publishing its own newspaper. Within two years, 300 societies had been organised all over Norway, with a total membership of 20,000 persons. The membership was drawn from the lower classes of both urban and rural areas; for the first time these two groups felt they had a common cause. In the end, the revolt was easily crushed; Thrane was captured and in 1855, after four years in jail, was sentenced to three additional years for crimes against the safety of the state. Upon his release, Marcus Thrane attempted unsuccessfully to revitalise his movement, but after the death of his wife, he migrated to the United States.

In 1898, all men were granted universal suffrage, followed by all women in 1913.

Dissolution of the union and the first World War 

Christian Michelsen, a shipping magnate and statesman, and Prime Minister of Norway from 1905 to 1907, played a central role in the peaceful separation of Norway from Sweden on 7 June 1905. A national referendum confirmed the people's preference for a monarchy over a republic. However, no Norwegian could legitimately claim the throne, since none of Norway's noble families could claim descent from medieval royalty. In European tradition, royal or "blue" blood is a precondition for laying claim to the throne.

The government then offered the throne of Norway to Prince Carl of Denmark, a prince of the Dano-German royal house of Schleswig-Holstein-Sonderburg-Glücksburg and a distant relative of several of Norway's medieval kings. After centuries of close ties between Norway and Denmark, a prince from the latter was the obvious choice for a European prince who could best relate to the Norwegian people. Following the plebiscite, he was unanimously elected king by the Norwegian Parliament, the first king of a fully independent Norway in 508 years (1397: Kalmar Union); he took the name Haakon VII. In 1905, the country welcomed the prince from neighbouring Denmark, his wife Maud of Wales and their young son to re-establish Norway's royal house.

Throughout the First World War, Norway remained neutral; however, diplomatic pressure from the British government meant that it heavily favoured the Allies during the war. During the war, Norway exported fish to both Germany and Britain, until an ultimatum from the British government and anti-German sentiments as a result of German submarines targeting Norwegian merchantmen led to a termination of trade with Germany. 436 Norwegian merchantmen were sunk by the Kaiserliche Marine during the war, with 1,150 Norwegian sailors losing their lives.

Second World War 

Norway once more proclaimed its neutrality during the Second World War, but this time, it was invaded by German forces on 9 April 1940. Although Norway was unprepared for the German surprise attack (see: Battle of Drøbak Sound, Norwegian Campaign, and Invasion of Norway), military and naval resistance lasted for two months. Norwegian armed forces in the north launched an offensive against the German forces in the Battles of Narvik, until they were forced to surrender on 10 June after losing British support which had been diverted to France during the German invasion of France.

King Haakon and the Norwegian government escaped to Rotherhithe in London. Throughout the war they sent inspirational radio speeches and supported clandestine military actions in Norway against the Germans. On the day of the invasion, the leader of the small National-Socialist party Nasjonal Samling, Vidkun Quisling, tried to seize power, but was forced by the German occupiers to step aside. Real power was wielded by the leader of the German occupation authority, Reichskommissar Josef Terboven. Quisling, as minister president, later formed a collaborationist government under German control. Up to 15,000 Norwegians volunteered to fight in German units, including the Waffen-SS.

The fraction of the Norwegian population that supported Germany was traditionally smaller than in Sweden, but greater than is generally appreciated today. It included a number of prominent personalities such as the Nobel-prize winning novelist Knut Hamsun. The concept of a "Germanic Union" of member states fit well into their thoroughly nationalist-patriotic ideology.

Many Norwegians and persons of Norwegian descent joined the Allied forces as well as the Free Norwegian Forces. In June 1940, a small group had left Norway following their king to Britain. This group included 13 ships, five aircraft, and 500 men from the Royal Norwegian Navy. By the end of the war, the force had grown to 58 ships and 7,500 men in service in the Royal Norwegian Navy, 5 squadrons of aircraft (including Spitfires, Sunderland flying boats and Mosquitos) in the newly formed Norwegian Air Force, and land forces including the Norwegian Independent Company 1 and 5 Troop as well as No. 10 Commandos.

During the five years of German occupation, Norwegians built a resistance movement which fought the German occupation forces with both civil disobedience and armed resistance including the destruction of Norsk Hydro's heavy water plant and stockpile of heavy water at Vemork, which crippled the German nuclear programme (see: Norwegian heavy water sabotage). More important to the Allied war effort, however, was the role of the Norwegian Merchant Marine. At the time of the invasion, Norway had the fourth-largest merchant marine fleet in the world. It was led by the Norwegian shipping company Nortraship under the Allies throughout the war and took part in every war operation from the evacuation of Dunkirk to the Normandy landings. Every December Norway gives a Christmas tree to the United Kingdom as thanks for the British assistance during the Second World War. A ceremony takes place to erect the tree in London's Trafalgar Square.

Svalbard was not occupied by German troops, but Germany secretly established a meteorological station there in 1944; the crew was stranded after the general capitulation in May 1945 and were rescued by a Norwegian seal hunter on 4 September. They were the last German soldiers to surrender in WW2.

Post-World War II history 
From 1945 to 1962, the Labour Party held an absolute majority in the parliament. The government, led by prime minister Einar Gerhardsen, embarked on a programme inspired by Keynesian economics, emphasising state financed industrialisation and co-operation between trade unions and employers' organisations. Many measures of state control of the economy imposed during the war were continued, although the rationing of dairy products was lifted in 1949, while price controls and rationing of housing and cars continued until 1960.

The wartime alliance with the United Kingdom and the United States was continued in the post-war years. Although pursuing the goal of a socialist economy, the Labour Party distanced itself from the Communists, especially after the Communists' seizure of power in Czechoslovakia in 1948, and strengthened its foreign policy and defence policy ties with the US. Norway received Marshall Plan aid from the United States starting in 1947, joined the Organisation for Economic Co-operation and Development (OECD) one year later, and became a founding member of the North Atlantic Treaty Organization (NATO) in 1949.

The first oil was discovered at the small Balder field in 1967, but production only began in 1999. In 1969, the Phillips Petroleum Company discovered petroleum resources at the Ekofisk field west of Norway. In 1973, the Norwegian government founded the State oil company, Statoil (now Equinor). Oil production did not provide net income until the early 1980s because of the large capital investment that was required to establish the country's petroleum industry. Around 1975, both the proportion and absolute number of workers in industry peaked. Since then labour-intensive industries and services like factory mass production and shipping have largely been outsourced.

Norway was a founding member of the European Free Trade Association (EFTA). Norway was twice invited to join the European Union, but ultimately declined to join after referendums that failed by narrow margins in 1972 and 1994.

In 1981, a Conservative Party government led by Kåre Willoch replaced the Labour Party with a policy of stimulating the stagflated economy with tax cuts, economic liberalisation, deregulation of markets, and measures to curb record-high inflation (13.6% in 1981).

Norway's first female prime minister Gro Harlem Brundtland of the Labour Party continued many of the reforms of her Conservative predecessor, while backing traditional Labour concerns such as social security, high taxes, the industrialisation of nature, and feminism. By the late 1990s, Norway had paid off its foreign debt and had started accumulating a sovereign wealth fund. Since the 1990s, a divisive question in politics has been how much of the income from petroleum production the government should spend, and how much it should save.

In 2011, Norway suffered two terrorist attacks on the same day conducted by Anders Behring Breivik which struck the government quarter in Oslo and a summer camp of the Labour party's youth movement at Utøya island, resulting in 77 deaths and 319 wounded.

Jens Stoltenberg, leader of the Labour Party, led Norway as Prime Minister for eight years from 2005 to 2013. The 2013 Norwegian parliamentary election brought a more conservative government to power, with the Conservative Party and the Progress Party winning 43% of the electorate's votes. In the Norwegian parliamentary election 2017 the centre-right government of Prime Minister Erna Solberg won re-election. The 2021 Norwegian parliamentary election saw a big win for the left-wing opposition in an election fought on climate change, inequality, and oil. Labour leader Jonas Gahr Støre was sworn in as new prime minister, in a centre-left minority government comprising 10 women and nine men.

Geography 

Norway's core territory comprises the western and northernmost portion of the Scandinavian Peninsula; the remote island of Jan Mayen and the archipelago of Svalbard are also part of the Kingdom of Norway. The Antarctic Peter I Island and the sub-Antarctic Bouvet Island are dependent territories and thus not considered part of the Kingdom. Norway also lays claim to a section of Antarctica known as Queen Maud Land. From the Middle Ages to 1814 Norway was part of the Danish kingdom. Norwegian possessions in the North Atlantic, Faroe Islands, Greenland, and Iceland, remained Danish when Norway was passed to Sweden at the Treaty of Kiel. Norway also comprised Bohuslän until 1658, Jämtland and Härjedalen until 1645, Shetland and Orkney until 1468, and the Hebrides and Isle of Man until the Treaty of Perth in 1266.

Norway comprises the western and northernmost part of Scandinavia in Northern Europe. Norway lies between latitudes 57° and 81° N, and longitudes 4° and 32° E. Norway is the northernmost of the Nordic countries and if Svalbard is included also the easternmost. Vardø at 31° 10' 07" east of Greenwich lies further east than St. Petersburg and Istanbul. Norway includes the northernmost point on the European mainland. The rugged coastline is broken by huge fjords and thousands of islands. To the north, west and south, Norway is bordered by the Barents Sea, the Norwegian Sea, the North Sea, and Skagerrak. The Scandinavian Mountains form much of the border with Sweden.

At  (including Svalbard and Jan Mayen) (and  without), much of the country is dominated by mountainous or high terrain, with a great variety of natural features caused by prehistoric glaciers and varied topography. The most noticeable of these are the fjords: deep grooves cut into the land flooded by the sea following the end of the Ice Age. Hornindalsvatnet is the deepest lake in all Europe. Norway has about 400,000 lakes. There are 239,057 registered islands. Permafrost can be found all year in the higher mountain areas and in the interior of Finnmark county. Numerous glaciers are found in Norway.

The land is mostly made of hard granite and gneiss rock, but slate, sandstone, and limestone are also common, and the lowest elevations contain marine deposits. Because of the Gulf Stream and prevailing westerlies, Norway experiences higher temperatures and more precipitation than expected at such northern latitudes, especially along the coast. The mainland experiences four distinct seasons, with colder winters and less precipitation inland. The northernmost part has a mostly maritime Subarctic climate, while Svalbard has an Arctic tundra climate.

Because of the large latitudinal range of the country and the varied topography and climate, Norway has a larger number of different habitats than almost any other European country. There are approximately 60,000 species in Norway and adjacent waters (excluding bacteria and viruses). The Norwegian Shelf large marine ecosystem is considered highly productive.

Climate 

The southern and western parts of Norway, fully exposed to Atlantic storm fronts, experience more precipitation and have milder winters than the eastern and far northern parts. Areas to the east of the coastal mountains are in a rain shadow, and have lower rain and snow totals than the west. The lowlands around Oslo have the warmest summers, but also cold weather and snow in wintertime. The sunniest weather is along the south coast, but sometimes even the coast far north can be very sunny – the sunniest month with 430 sun hours was recorded in Tromsø.

Because of Norway's high latitude, there are large seasonal variations in daylight. From late May to late July, the sun never completely descends beneath the horizon in areas north of the Arctic Circle (hence Norway's description as the "Land of the Midnight sun"), and the rest of the country experiences up to 20 hours of daylight per day. Conversely, from late November to late January, the sun never rises above the horizon in the north, and daylight hours are very short in the rest of the country.

The coastal climate of Norway is exceptionally mild compared with areas on similar latitudes elsewhere in the world, with the Gulf Stream passing directly offshore the northern areas of the Atlantic coast, continuously warming the region in the winter. Temperature anomalies found in coastal locations are exceptional, with southern Lofoten and Bø having all monthly means above freezing (lacking a meteorological winter) in spite of being north of the Arctic Circle. The very northernmost coast of Norway would thus be ice-covered in winter if not for the Gulf Stream. The east of the country has a more continental climate, and the mountain ranges have subarctic and tundra climates. There is also higher rainfall in areas exposed to the Atlantic, especially the western slopes of the mountain ranges and areas close, such as Bergen. The valleys east of the mountain ranges are the driest; some of the valleys are sheltered by mountains in most directions. Saltdal (81 m) in Nordland is the driest place with  precipitation annually (1991–2020). In southern Norway, Skjåk in Innlandet get  precipitation. Finnmarksvidda and some interior valleys of Troms receive around  annually, and the high Arctic Longyearbyen .

Parts of southeastern Norway including parts of Mjøsa have a humid continental climates (Köppen Dfb), while the southern and western coasts and also the coast north to Bodø have a oceanic climate (Cfb), while the outer coast further north almost to North Cape have a subpolar oceanic climate (Cfc). Further inland in the south and at higher altitudes, and also in much of Northern Norway, the subarctic climate (Dfc) dominates. A small strip of land along the coast east of North Cape (including Vardø) earlier had tundra/alpine/polar climate (ET), but this is mostly gone with the updated 1991–2020 climate normals, making this also subarctic. Large parts of Norway are covered by mountains and high altitude plateaus, and about one third of the land is above the treeline and thus exhibit tundra/alpine/polar climate (ET).

Biodiversity 

The total number of species include 16,000 species of insects (probably 4,000 more species yet to be described), 20,000 species of algae, 1,800 species of lichen, 1,050 species of mosses, 2,800 species of vascular plants, up to 7,000 species of fungi, 450 species of birds (250 species nesting in Norway), 90 species of mammals, 45 fresh-water species of fish, 150 salt-water species of fish, 1,000 species of fresh-water invertebrates, and 3,500 species of salt-water invertebrates. About 40,000 of these species have been described by science. The red list of 2010 encompasses 4,599 species. Norway contains five terrestrial ecoregions: Sarmatic mixed forests, Scandinavian coastal conifer forests, Scandinavian and Russian taiga, Kola Peninsula tundra, and Scandinavian montane birch forest and grasslands.

Seventeen species are listed mainly because they are endangered on a global scale, such as the European beaver, even if the population in Norway is not seen as endangered. The number of threatened and near-threatened species equals to 3,682; it includes 418 fungi species, many of which are closely associated with the small remaining areas of old-growth forests, 36 bird species, and 16 species of mammals. In 2010, 2,398 species were listed as endangered or vulnerable; of these were 1250 listed as vulnerable (VU), 871 as endangered (EN), and 276 species as critically endangered (CR), among which were the grey wolf, the Arctic fox (healthy population on Svalbard) and the pool frog.

The largest predator in Norwegian waters is the sperm whale, and the largest fish is the basking shark. The largest predator on land is the polar bear, while the brown bear is the largest predator on the Norwegian mainland. The largest land animal on the mainland is the elk (American English: moose). The elk in Norway is known for its size and strength and is often called skogens konge, "king of the forest".

Environment 
Attractive and dramatic scenery and landscape are found throughout Norway. The west coast of southern Norway and the coast of northern Norway present some of the most visually impressive coastal sceneries in the world. National Geographic has listed the Norwegian fjords as the world's top tourist attraction. The country is also home to the natural phenomena of the Midnight sun (during summer), as well as the Aurora borealis known also as the Northern lights.

The 2016 Environmental Performance Index from Yale University, Columbia University and the World Economic Forum put Norway in seventeenth place, immediately below Croatia and Switzerland. The index is based on environmental risks to human health, habitat loss, and changes in  emissions. The index notes over-exploitation of fisheries, but not Norway's whaling or oil exports. Norway had a 2019 Forest Landscape Integrity Index mean score of 6.98/10, ranking it 60th globally out of 172 countries.

Politics and government 

Norway is considered to be one of the most developed democracies and states of justice in the world. From 1814, c. 45% of men (25 years and older) had the right to vote, whereas the United Kingdom had c. 20% (1832), Sweden c. 5% (1866), and Belgium c. 1.15% (1840). Since 2010, Norway has been classified as the world's most democratic country by the Democracy Index.

According to the Constitution of Norway, which was adopted on 17 May 1814 and was inspired by the United States Declaration of Independence and French Revolution of 1776 and 1789, respectively, Norway is a unitary constitutional monarchy with a parliamentary system of government, wherein the King of Norway is the head of state and the prime minister is the head of government. Power is separated among the legislative, executive and judicial branches of government, as defined by the Constitution, which serves as the country's supreme legal document.

The monarch officially retains executive power. But following the introduction of a parliamentary system of government, the duties of the monarch have since become strictly representative and ceremonial, such as the formal appointment and dismissal of the Prime Minister and other ministers in the executive government. Accordingly, the Monarch is commander-in-chief of the Norwegian Armed Forces, and serves as chief diplomatic official abroad and as a symbol of unity. Harald V of the House of Schleswig-Holstein-Sonderburg-Glücksburg was crowned King of Norway in 1991, the first since the 14th century who has been born in the country. Haakon, Crown Prince of Norway, is the legal and rightful heir to the throne and the Kingdom.

In practice, the Prime Minister exercises the executive powers. Constitutionally, legislative power is vested with both the government and the Parliament of Norway, but the latter is the supreme legislature and a unicameral body. Norway is fundamentally structured as a representative democracy. The Parliament can pass a law by simple majority of the 169 representatives, who are elected on the basis of proportional representation from 19 constituencies for four-year terms.

150 are elected directly from the 19 constituencies, and an additional 19 seats ("levelling seats") are allocated on a nationwide basis to make the representation in parliament correspond better with the popular vote for the political parties. A 4% election threshold is required for a party to gain levelling seats in Parliament. There are a total of 169 members of parliament.

The Parliament of Norway, called the Storting (meaning Grand Assembly), ratifies national treaties developed by the executive branch. It can impeach members of the government if their acts are declared unconstitutional. If an indicted suspect is impeached, Parliament has the power to remove the person from office.

The position of prime minister, Norway's head of government, is allocated to the member of Parliament who can obtain the confidence of a majority in Parliament, usually the current leader of the largest political party or, more effectively, through a coalition of parties. A single party generally does not have sufficient political power in terms of the number of seats to form a government on its own. Norway has often been ruled by minority governments.

The prime minister nominates the cabinet, traditionally drawn from members of the same political party or parties in the Storting, making up the government. The PM organises the executive government and exercises its power as vested by the Constitution. Norway has a state church, the Lutheran Church of Norway, which has in recent years gradually been granted more internal autonomy in day-to-day affairs, but which still has a special constitutional status. Formerly, the PM had to have more than half the members of cabinet be members of the Church of Norway, meaning at least ten out of the 19 ministries. This rule was however removed in 2012. The issue of separation of church and state in Norway has been increasingly controversial, as many people believe it is time to change this, to reflect the growing diversity in the population. A part of this is the evolution of the public school subject Christianity, a required subject since 1739. Even the state's loss in a battle at the European Court of Human Rights at Strasbourg in 2007 did not settle the matter. As of 1 January 2017, the Church of Norway is a separate legal entity, and no longer a branch of the civil service.

Through the Council of State, a privy council presided over by the monarch, the prime minister and the cabinet meet at the Royal Palace and formally consult the Monarch. All government bills need the formal approval by the monarch before and after introduction to Parliament. The Council reviews and approves all of the monarch's actions as head of state. Although all government and parliamentary acts are decided beforehand, the privy council is an example of symbolic gesture the king retains.

Members of the Storting are directly elected from party-lists proportional representation in nineteen plural-member constituencies in a national multi-party system. Historically, both the Norwegian Labour Party and Conservative Party have played leading political roles. In the early 21st century, the Labour Party has been in power since the 2005 election, in a Red–Green Coalition with the Socialist Left Party and the Centre Party.

Since 2005, both the Conservative Party and the Progress Party have won numerous seats in the Parliament, but not sufficient in the 2009 general election to overthrow the coalition. Commentators have pointed to the poor co-operation between the opposition parties, including the Liberals and the Christian Democrats. Jens Stoltenberg, the leader of the Labour Party, continued to have the necessary majority through his multi-party alliance to continue as PM until 2013.

In national elections in September 2013, voters ended eight years of Labour rule. Two political parties, Høyre and Fremskrittspartiet, elected on promises of tax cuts, more spending on infrastructure and education, better services and stricter rules on immigration, formed a government. Coming at a time when Norway's economy is in good condition with low unemployment, the rise of the right appeared to be based on other issues. Erna Solberg became prime minister, the second female prime minister after Gro Harlem Brundtland and the first conservative prime minister since Jan P. Syse. Solberg said her win was "a historic election victory for the right-wing parties". Her centre-right government won re-election in the 2017 Norwegian parliamentary election. Norway's new centre-left cabinet under Prime Minister Jonas Gahr Støre, the leader the Labour Party, took office on 14 October 2021.

Administrative divisions 

Norway, a unitary state, is divided into eleven first-level administrative counties (fylke). The counties are administered through directly elected county assemblies who elect the County Governor. Additionally, the King and government are represented in every county by a fylkesmann, who effectively acts as a Governor. As such, the Government is directly represented at a local level through the County Governors' offices. The counties are then sub-divided into 356 second-level municipalities (kommuner), which in turn are administered by directly elected municipal council, headed by a mayor and a small executive cabinet. The capital of Oslo is considered both a county and a municipality. Norway has two integral overseas territories out of mainland: Jan Mayen and Svalbard, the only developed island in the archipelago of the same name, located far to the north of the Norwegian mainland.

96 settlements have city status in Norway. In most cases, the city borders are coterminous with the borders of their respective municipalities. Often, Norwegian city municipalities include large areas that are not developed; for example, Oslo municipality contains large forests, located north and southeast of the city, and over half of Bergen municipality consists of mountainous areas.

The counties of Norway are:

Dependencies of Norway 

There are three Antarctic and Subantarctic dependencies: Bouvet Island, Peter I Island, and Queen Maud Land. On most maps, there had been an unclaimed area between Queen Maud Land and the South Pole until 12 June 2015 when Norway formally annexed that area.

Largest populated areas

Judicial system and law enforcement 

Norway uses a civil law system where laws are created and amended in Parliament and the system regulated through the Courts of justice of Norway. It consists of the Supreme Court of 20 permanent judges and a Chief Justice, appellate courts, city and district courts, and conciliation councils. The judiciary is independent of executive and legislative branches. While the Prime Minister nominates Supreme Court Justices for office, their nomination must be approved by Parliament and formally confirmed by the Monarch in the Council of State. Usually, judges attached to regular courts are formally appointed by the Monarch on the advice of the Prime Minister.

The Courts' strict and formal mission is to regulate the Norwegian judicial system, interpret the Constitution, and as such implement the legislation adopted by Parliament. In its judicial reviews, it monitors the legislative and executive branches to ensure that they comply with provisions of enacted legislation.

The law is enforced in Norway by the Norwegian Police Service. It is a Unified National Police Service made up of 27 Police Districts and several specialist agencies, such as Norwegian National Authority for the Investigation and Prosecution of Economic and Environmental Crime, known as Økokrim; and the National Criminal Investigation Service, known as Kripos, each headed by a chief of police. The Police Service is headed by the National Police Directorate, which reports to the Ministry of Justice and the Police. The Police Directorate is headed by a National Police Commissioner. The only exception is the Norwegian Police Security Agency, whose head answers directly to the Ministry of Justice and the Police.

Norway abolished the death penalty for regular criminal acts in 1902. The legislature abolished the death penalty for high treason in war and war-crimes in 1979. Reporters Without Borders, in its 2007 Worldwide Press Freedom Index, ranked Norway at a shared first place (along with Iceland) out of 169 countries.

In general, the legal and institutional framework in Norway is characterised by a high degree of transparency, accountability and integrity, and the perception and the occurrence of corruption are very low. Norway has ratified all relevant international anti-corruption conventions, and its standards of implementation and enforcement of anti-corruption legislation are considered very high by many international anti-corruption working groups such as the OECD Anti-Bribery Working Group. However, there are some isolated cases showing that some municipalities have abused their position in public procurement processes.

Norwegian prisons are humane, rather than tough, with emphasis on rehabilitation. At 20%, Norway's re-conviction rate is among the lowest in the world.

Human rights 

Norway has been considered a progressive country, which has adopted legislation and policies to support women's rights, minority rights, and LGBT rights. As early as 1884, 171 of the leading figures, among them five Prime Ministers for the Liberal Party and the Conservative Party, co-founded the Norwegian Association for Women's Rights. They successfully campaigned for women's right to education, women's suffrage, the right to work, and other gender equality policies. From the 1970s, gender equality also came high on the state agenda, with the establishment of a public body to promote gender equality, which evolved into the Gender Equality and Anti-Discrimination Ombud. Civil society organisations also continue to play an important role, and the women's rights organisations are today organised in the Norwegian Women's Lobby umbrella organisation.

In 1990, the Norwegian constitution was amended to grant absolute primogeniture to the Norwegian throne, meaning that the eldest child, regardless of gender, takes precedence in the line of succession. As it was not retroactive, the current successor to the throne is the eldest son of the King, rather than his eldest child. The Norwegian constitution Article 6 states that "For those born before the year 1990 it shall...be the case that a male shall take precedence over a female."

The Sámi people have for centuries been the subject of discrimination and abuse by the dominant cultures in Scandinavia and Russia, those countries claiming possession of Sámi lands. The Sámi people have never been a single community in a single region of Sápmi. Norway has been greatly criticised by the international community for the politics of Norwegianization of and discrimination against the indigenous population of the country. Nevertheless, Norway was, in 1990, the first country to recognise ILO-convention 169 on indigenous people recommended by the UN.

In regard to LGBT rights, Norway was the first country in the world to enact an anti-discrimination law protecting the rights of gays and lesbians. In 1993, Norway became the second country to legalise civil union partnerships for same-sex couples, and on 1 January 2009 Norway became the sixth country to legalise same-sex marriage. As a promoter of human rights, Norway has held the annual Oslo Freedom Forum conference, a gathering described by The Economist as "on its way to becoming a human-rights equivalent of the Davos economic forum."

Foreign relations 

Norway maintains embassies in 82 countries. 60 countries maintain an embassy in Norway, all of them in the capital, Oslo.

Norway is a founding member of the United Nations (UN), the North Atlantic Treaty Organization (NATO), the Council of Europe and the European Free Trade Association (EFTA). Norway issued applications for accession to the European Union (EU) and its predecessors in 1962, 1967 and 1992, respectively. While Denmark, Sweden and Finland obtained membership, the Norwegian electorate rejected the treaties of accession in referendums in 1972 and 1994.

After the 1994 referendum, Norway maintained its membership in the European Economic Area (EEA), an arrangement granting the country access to the internal market of the Union, on the condition that Norway implements the Union's pieces of legislation which are deemed relevant (of which there were approximately seven thousand by 2010) Successive Norwegian governments have, since 1994, requested participation in parts of the EU's co-operation that go beyond the provisions of the EEA agreement. Non-voting participation by Norway has been granted in, for instance, the Union's Common Security and Defence Policy, the Schengen Agreement, and the European Defence Agency, as well as 19 separate programmes.

Norway participated in the 1990s brokering of the Oslo Accords, an unsuccessful attempt to resolve the Israeli–Palestinian conflict.

Military 

The Norwegian Armed Forces numbers about 25,000 personnel, including civilian employees. According to 2009 mobilisation plans, full mobilisation produces approximately 83,000 combatant personnel. Norway has conscription (including 6–12 months of training); in 2013, the country became the first in Europe and NATO to draft women as well as men. However, due to less need for conscripts after the Cold War ended with the break-up of the Soviet Union, few people have to serve if they are not motivated. The Armed Forces are subordinate to the Norwegian Ministry of Defence. The Commander-in-Chief is King Harald V. The military of Norway is divided into the following branches: the Norwegian Army, the Royal Norwegian Navy, the Royal Norwegian Air Force, the Norwegian Cyber Defence Force and the Home Guard.

In response to its being overrun by Germany in 1940, the country was one of the founding nations of the North Atlantic Treaty Organization (NATO) on 4 April 1949. Norway contributed in the International Security Assistance Force (ISAF) in Afghanistan. Additionally, Norway has contributed in several missions in contexts of the United Nations, NATO, and the Common Security and Defence Policy of the European Union.

Economy 

Norwegians enjoy the second-highest GDP per-capita among European countries (after Luxembourg), and the sixth-highest GDP (PPP) per-capita in the world. Today, Norway ranks as the second-wealthiest country in the world in monetary value, with the largest capital reserve per capita of any nation. According to the CIA World Factbook, Norway is a net external creditor of debt. Norway maintained first place in the world in the UNDP Human Development Index (HDI) for six consecutive years (2001–2006), and then reclaimed this position in 2009. The standard of living in Norway is among the highest in the world. Foreign Policy magazine ranks Norway last in its Failed States Index for 2009, judging Norway to be the world's most well-functioning and stable country. The OECD ranks Norway fourth in the 2013 equalised Better Life Index and third in intergenerational earnings elasticity.

The Norwegian economy is an example of a mixed economy; a prosperous capitalist welfare state, it features a combination of free market activity and large state ownership in certain key sectors, influenced by both liberal governments from the late 19th century and later by social democratic governments in the postwar era. Public health care in Norway is free (after an annual charge of around 2000 kroner for those over 16), and parents have 46 weeks paid parental leave. The state income derived from natural resources includes a significant contribution from petroleum production. Norway has an unemployment rate of 4.8%, with 68% of the population aged 15–74 employed. People in the labour force are either employed or looking for work. 9.5% of the population aged 18–66 receive a disability pension and 30% of the labour force are employed by the government, the highest in the OECD. The hourly productivity levels, as well as average hourly wages in Norway, are among the highest in the world.

The egalitarian values of Norwegian society have kept the wage difference between the lowest paid worker and the CEO of most companies as much less than in comparable western economies. This is also evident in Norway's low Gini coefficient.

The state has large ownership positions in key industrial sectors, such as the strategic petroleum sector (Equinor), hydroelectric energy production (Statkraft), aluminium production (Norsk Hydro), the largest Norwegian bank (DNB), and telecommunication provider (Telenor). Through these big companies, the government controls approximately 30% of the stock values at the Oslo Stock Exchange. When non-listed companies are included, the state has even higher share in ownership (mainly from direct oil licence ownership). Norway is a major shipping nation and has the world's sixth largest merchant fleet, with 1,412 Norwegian-owned merchant vessels.

By referendums in 1972 and 1994, Norwegians rejected proposals to join the European Union (EU). However, Norway, together with Iceland and Liechtenstein, participates in the European Union's single market through the European Economic Area (EEA) agreement. The EEA Treaty between the European Union countries and the EFTA countries—transposed into Norwegian law via "EØS-loven"—describes the procedures for implementing European Union rules in Norway and the other EFTA countries. Norway is a highly integrated member of most sectors of the EU internal market. Some sectors, such as agriculture, oil and fish, are not wholly covered by the EEA Treaty. Norway has also acceded to the Schengen Agreement and several other intergovernmental agreements among the EU member states.

The country is richly endowed with natural resources including petroleum, hydropower, fish, forests, and minerals. Large reserves of petroleum and natural gas were discovered in the 1960s, which led to a boom in the economy. Norway has obtained one of the highest standards of living in the world in part by having a large amount of natural resources compared to the size of the population. In 2011, 28% of state revenues were generated from the petroleum industry.

Norway is the first country which banned cutting of trees (deforestation), in order to prevent rain forests from vanishing. The country declared its intention at the UN Climate Summit in 2014, alongside Great Britain and Germany. Crops that are typically linked to forests' destruction are timber, soy and palm oil, while beef is also damaging. Now Norway has to find a new way to provide these essential products without exerting negative influence on its environment.

Resources 

Oil industry

Export revenues from oil and gas have risen to over 40% of total exports and constitute almost 20% of the GDP. Norway is the fifth-largest oil exporter and third-largest gas exporter in the world, but it is not a member of OPEC. In 1995, the Norwegian government established the sovereign wealth fund ("Government Pension Fund – Global"), which would be funded with oil revenues, including taxes, dividends, sales revenues and licensing fees. This was intended to reduce overheating in the economy from oil revenues, minimise uncertainty from volatility in oil price, and provide a cushion to compensate for expenses associated with the ageing of the population.

The government controls its petroleum resources through a combination of state ownership in major operators in the oil fields (with approximately 62% ownership in Equinor in 2007) and the fully state-owned Petoro, which has a market value of about twice Equinor, and SDFI. Finally, the government controls licensing of exploration and production of fields. The fund invests in developed financial markets outside Norway. Spending from the fund is constrained by the budgetary rule (Handlingsregelen), which limits spending over time to no more than the real value yield of the fund, originally assumed to be 4% a year, but lowered in 2017 to 3% of the fund's total value.

Between 1966 and 2013, Norwegian companies drilled 5,085 oil wells, mostly in the North Sea. Of these, 3,672 are utviklingsbrønner (regular production); 1,413 are letebrønner (exploration); and 1,405 have been terminated (avsluttet).

Both oil fields are located in the Barents Sea.

Norway is also the world's second-largest exporter of fish (in value, after China). Fish from fish farms and catch constitutes the second largest (behind oil/natural gas) export product measured in value. Norway is the world's largest producer of salmon, followed by Chile.

Hydroelectric plants generate roughly 98–99% of Norway's electric power, more than any other country in the world.

Norway contains significant mineral resources, and in 2013, its mineral production was valued at US$1.5 billion (Norwegian Geological Survey data). The most valuable minerals are calcium carbonate (limestone), building stone, nepheline syenite, olivine, iron, titanium, and nickel.

In 2017, the Government Pension Fund controlled assets surpassed a value of US$1 trillion (equal to US$190,000 per capita), about 250% of Norway's 2017 GDP. It is the largest sovereign wealth fund in the world. The fund controls about 1.3% of all listed shares in Europe, and more than 1% of all the publicly traded shares in the world. The Norwegian Central Bank operates investment offices in London, New York, and Shanghai. Guidelines implemented in 2007 allow the fund to invest up to 60% of the capital in shares (maximum of 40% prior), while the rest may be placed in bonds and real-estate. As the stock markets tumbled in September 2008, the fund was able to buy more shares at low prices. In this way, the losses incurred by the market turmoil was recuperated by November 2009.

Other nations with economies based on natural resources, such as Russia, are trying to learn from Norway by establishing similar funds. The investment choices of the Norwegian fund are directed by ethical guidelines; for example, the fund is not allowed to invest in companies that produce parts for nuclear weapons. Norway's highly transparent investment scheme is lauded by the international community. The future size of the fund is closely linked to the price of oil and to developments in international financial markets.

Transport 

Due to the low population density, narrow shape and long coastlines of Norway, its public transport is less developed than in many European countries, especially outside the major cities. The country has long-standing water transport traditions, but the Norwegian Ministry of Transport and Communications has in recent years implemented rail, road, and air transport through numerous subsidiaries to develop the country's infrastructure. Under discussion is development of a new high-speed rail system between the nation's largest cities.

The railways transported 56,827,000 passengers 2,956 million passenger-kilometres and 24,783,000 tonnes of cargo 3,414 million tonne-kilometres. The entire network is owned by the Norwegian National Rail Administration. All domestic passenger trains except the Airport Express Train are operated by Norges Statsbaner (NSB). Several companies operate freight trains.
Investment in new infrastructure and maintenance is financed through the state budget, and subsidies are provided for passenger train operations. NSB operates long-haul trains, including night trains, regional services and four commuter train systems, around Oslo, Trondheim, Bergen and Stavanger.

The four tiers of road routes are national, county, municipal and private, with national and primary county roads numbered en route. The most important national routes are part of the European route scheme. The two most prominent are the European route E6 going north–south through the entire country, and the E39, which follows the West Coast. National and county roads are managed by the Norwegian Public Roads Administration.

Norway has the world's largest registered stock of plug-in electric vehicles per capita. In March 2014, Norway became the first country where over 1 in every 100 passenger cars on the roads is a plug-in electric. The plug-in electric segment market share of new car sales is also the highest in the world. According to a report by Dagens Næringsliv in June 2016, the country would like to ban sales of gasoline and diesel powered vehicles as early as 2025. In June 2017, 42% of new cars registered were electric.

Of the 98 airports in Norway, 52 are public, and 46 are operated by the state-owned Avinor. Seven airports have more than one million passengers annually. A total of 41,089,675 passengers passed through Norwegian airports in 2007, of whom 13,397,458 were international.

The central gateway to Norway by air is Oslo Airport, Gardermoen. There are departures to most European countries and some intercontinental destinations. A direct high-speed train connects to Oslo Central Station every 10 minutes for a 20 min ride.

Research 

Internationally recognised Norwegian scientists include the mathematicians Niels Henrik Abel and Sophus Lie, who are recognized as some of the most influential mathematicians of all time. Caspar Wessel was the first to describe vectors and complex numbers in the complex plane. Ernst S. Selmer's advanced research lead to the modernisation of crypto-algorithms. Thoralf Skolem made revolutionary contributions to mathematical logic. Øystein Ore and Ludwig Sylow made important contributions in group theory. Atle Selberg was one of the most significant mathematicians of the 20th century, for which he was awarded a Fields Medal, Wolf Prize and Abel Prize.

Other scientists include the physicists Ægidius Elling, Ivar Giaever, Carl Anton Bjerknes, Christopher Hansteen, William Zachariasen and Kristian Birkeland, the neuroscientists May-Britt Moser and Edvard Moser, and the chemists Lars Onsager, Odd Hassel, Peter Waage, Erik Rotheim, and Cato Maximilian Guldberg. Mineralogist Victor Goldschmidt is considered to be one of two founders of modern geochemistry. The meteorologists Vilhelm Bjerknes and Ragnar Fjørtoft played a central role in the history of numerical weather prediction. Web pioneer Håkon Wium Lie developed Cascading Style Sheets, one of the three main pillars of the World Wide Web. Pål Spilling participated in the development of the Internet Protocol and brought the Internet to Europe, establishing the first network outside United States to be connected to the American Internet. Computer scientists Ole-Johan Dahl and Kristen Nygaard are considered to be the fathers of the tremendously influential Simula and object-oriented programming, for which they were awarded a Turing Award.

In the 20th century, Norwegian academics have been pioneering in many social sciences, including criminology, sociology and peace and conflict studies. Prominent academics include Arne Næss, a philosopher and founder of deep ecology; Johan Galtung, the founder of peace studies; Nils Christie and Thomas Mathiesen, criminologists; Fredrik Barth, a social anthropologist; Vilhelm Aubert, Harriet Holter and Erik Grønseth, sociologists; Tove Stang Dahl, a pioneer of women's law; Stein Rokkan, a political scientist; and Ragnar Frisch, Trygve Haavelmo, and Finn E. Kydland, economists.

The Kingdom of Norway has produced thirteen Nobel laureates. Norway was ranked 20th in the Global Innovation Index in 2020 and 2021, down from 19th in 2019.

Tourism 

In 2008, Norway ranked 17th in the World Economic Forum's Travel and Tourism Competitiveness Report. Tourism in Norway contributed to 4.2% of the gross domestic product as reported in 2016. Every one in fifteen people throughout the country work in the tourism industry. Tourism is seasonal in Norway, with more than half of total tourists visiting between the months of May and August.

The main attractions of Norway are the varied landscapes that extend across the Arctic Circle. It is famous for its fjord-indented coastline and its mountains, ski resorts, lakes and woods. Popular tourist destinations in Norway include Oslo, Ålesund, Bergen, Stavanger, Trondheim, Kristiansand and Tromsø. Much of the nature of Norway remains unspoiled, and thus attracts numerous hikers and skiers. The fjords, mountains and waterfalls in Western and Northern Norway attract several hundred thousand foreign tourists each year. In the cities, cultural idiosyncrasies such as the Holmenkollen ski jump attract many visitors, as do landmarks such as Bergen's Bryggen and Oslo's Vigeland Sculpture Park.

Demographics

Population 

Norway's population was 5,384,576 people in the third quarter of 2020. Norwegians are an ethnic North Germanic people. Since the late 20th century, Norway has attracted immigrants from southern and central Europe, the Middle East, Africa, Asia and beyond.

The total fertility rate (TFR) in 2018 was estimated at 1.56 children born per woman, below the replacement rate of 2.1, it remains considerably below the high of 4.69 children born per woman in 1877. In 2018 the median age of the Norwegian population was 39.3 years.

In 2012, an official study showed that 86% of the total population have at least one parent who was born in Norway. In 2020 approximately 980,000 individuals (18.2%) were immigrants and their descendants. Among these approximately 189,000 are children of immigrants, born in Norway.

Of these 980,000 immigrants and their descendants:
 485,500 (49.5%) have a Western background (Europe, USA, Canada and Oceania).
 493,700 (50.5%) have a non-Western background (Asia, Africa, South and Central America).

In 2013, the Norwegian government said that 14% of the Norwegian population were immigrants or children of two immigrant parents. About 6% of the population are immigrants from EU, North America and Australia, and about 8.1% come from Asia, Africa and Latin America.

In 2012, of the total 660,000 with immigrant background, 407,262 had Norwegian citizenship (62.2%).

Immigrants have settled in all Norwegian municipalities. The cities or municipalities with the highest share of immigrants in 2012 were Oslo (32%) and Drammen (27%). The share in Stavanger was 16%. According to Reuters, Oslo is the "fastest growing city in Europe because of increased immigration". In recent years, immigration has accounted for most of Norway's population growth. In 2018, immigrants accounted for 14.1% of Norway's population.

The Sámi people are indigenous to the Far North and have traditionally inhabited central and northern parts of Norway and Sweden, as well as areas in northern Finland and in Russia on the Kola Peninsula. Another national minority are the Kven people, descendants of Finnish-speaking people who migrated to northern Norway from the 18th up to the 20th century. From the 19th century up to the 1970s, the Norwegian government tried to assimilate both the Sámi and the Kven, encouraging them to adopt the majority language, culture and religion. Because of this "Norwegianization process", many families of Sámi or Kven ancestry now identify as ethnic Norwegian.

Migration 

Particularly in the 19th century, when economic conditions were difficult in Norway, tens of thousands of people migrated to the United States and Canada, where they could work and buy land in frontier areas. Many went to the Midwest and Pacific Northwest. In 2006, according to the US Census Bureau, almost 4.7 million persons identified as Norwegian Americans, which was larger than the population of ethnic Norwegians in Norway itself. In the 2011 Canadian census, 452,705 Canadian citizens identified as having Norwegian ancestry.

, the number of immigrants or children of two immigrants residing in Norway was 710,465, or 14.1% of the total population, up from 183,000 in 1992. Yearly immigration has increased since 2005. While yearly net immigration in 2001–2005 was on average 13,613, it increased to 37,541 between 2006 and 2010, and in 2011 net immigration reached 47,032. This is mostly because of increased immigration by residents of the EU, in particular from Poland.

In 2012, the immigrant community (which includes immigrants and children born in Norway of immigrant parents) grew by 55,300, a record high. Net immigration from abroad reached 47,300 (300 higher than in 2011), while immigration accounted for 72% of Norway's population growth. 17% of newborn children were born to immigrant parents. Children of Pakistani, Somali and Vietnamese parents made up the largest groups of all Norwegians born to immigrant parents.

Pakistani Norwegians are the largest non-European minority group in Norway. Most of their 32,700 members live in and around Oslo. The Iraqi and Somali immigrant populations have increased significantly in recent years. After the enlargement of the EU in 2004, a wave of immigrants arrived from Central and Northern Europe, particularly Poland, Sweden and Lithuania. The fastest growing immigrant groups in 2011 in absolute numbers were from Poland, Lithuania and Sweden. The policies of immigration and integration have been the subject of much debate in Norway.

Religion

Church of Norway 

Separation of church and state happened significantly later in Norway than in most of Europe, and remains incomplete. In 2012, the Norwegian parliament voted to grant the Church of Norway greater autonomy, a decision which was confirmed in a constitutional amendment on 21 May 2012.

Until 2012 parliamentary officials were required to be members of the Evangelical-Lutheran Church of Norway, and at least half of all government ministers had to be a member of the state church. As state church, the Church of Norway's clergy were viewed as state employees, and the central and regional church administrations were part of the state administration. Members of the Royal family are required to be members of the Lutheran church. On 1 January 2017, Norway made the church independent of the state, but retained the Church's status as the "people's church".

Most Norwegians are registered at baptism as members of the Church of Norway, which has been Norway's state church since its establishment. In recent years the church has been granted increasing internal autonomy, but it retains its special constitutional status and other special ties to the state, and the constitution requires that the reigning monarch must be a member and states that the country's values are based on its Christian and humanist heritage. Many remain in the church to participate in the community and practices such as baptism, confirmation, marriage and burial rites. About 70.6% of Norwegians were members of the Church of Norway in 2017. In 2017, about 53.6% of all newborns were baptised and about 57.9% of all 15-year-old persons were confirmed in the church.

Religious affiliation 

According to the 2010 Eurobarometer Poll, 22% of Norwegian citizens responded that "they believe there is a God", 44% responded that "they believe there is some sort of spirit or life force" and 29% responded that "they don't believe there is any sort of spirit, God or life force". Five percent gave no response. In the early 1990s, studies estimated that between 4.7% and 5.3% of Norwegians attended church on a weekly basis. This figure has dropped to about 2%.

In 2010, 10% of the population was religiously unaffiliated, while another 9% were members of religious communities outside the Church of Norway. Other Christian denominations total about 4.9% of the population, the largest of which is the Roman Catholic Church, with 83,000 members, according to 2009 government statistics. The Aftenposten (Norwegian, The Evening Post) in October 2012 reported there were about 115,234 registered Roman Catholics in Norway; the reporter estimated that the total number of people with a Roman Catholic background may be 170,000–200,000 or higher.

Others include Pentecostals (39,600), the Evangelical Lutheran Free Church of Norway (19,600), Methodists (11,000), Baptists (9,900), Eastern Orthodox (9,900), Brunstad Christian Church (6,800), Seventh-day Adventists (5,100), Assyrians and Chaldeans, and others. The Swedish, Finnish and Icelandic Lutheran congregations in Norway have about 27,500 members in total. Other Christian denominations comprise less than 1% each, including 4,000 members in the Church of Jesus Christ of Latter-day Saints and 12,000 Jehovah's Witnesses.
Among non-Christian religions, Islam is the largest, with 166,861 registered members (2018), and probably fewer than 200,000 in total. It is practised mainly by Somali, Arab, Bosniak, Kurdish and Turkish immigrants, as well as Norwegians of Pakistani descent.

Other religions comprise less than 1% each, including 819 adherents of Judaism. Indian immigrants introduced Hinduism to Norway, which in 2011 has slightly more than 5,900 adherents, or 1% of non-Lutheran Norwegians. Sikhism has approximately 3,000 adherents, with most living in Oslo, which has two gurdwaras. Sikhs first came to Norway in the early 1970s. The troubles in Punjab after Operation Blue Star and riots committed against Sikhs in India after the assassination of Indira Gandhi led to an increase in Sikh refugees moving to Norway. Drammen also has a sizeable population of Sikhs; the largest gurdwara in north Europe was built in Lier. There are eleven Buddhist organisations, grouped under the Buddhistforbundet organisation, with slightly over 14,000 members, which make up 0.2% of the population. The Baháʼí Faith religion has slightly more than 1,000 adherents. Around 1.7% (84,500) of Norwegians belong to the secular Norwegian Humanist Association.

From 2006 to 2011, the fastest-growing religious communities in Norway were Eastern Orthodox Christianity and Oriental Orthodox Christianity, which grew in membership by 80%; however, their share of the total population remains small, at 0.2%. It is associated with the immigration from Eritrea and Ethiopia, and to a lesser extent from Central and Eastern European and Middle Eastern countries. Other fast-growing religions were Roman Catholicism (78.7%), Hinduism (59.6%), Islam (48.1%), and Buddhism (46.7%).

Indigenous religions 
As in other Scandinavian countries, the ancient Norse followed a form of native Germanic paganism known as Norse paganism. By the end of the 11th century, when Norway had been Christianised, the indigenous Norse religion and practices were prohibited. Remnants of the native religion and beliefs of Norway survive today in the form of names, referential names of cities and locations, the days of the week, and other parts of everyday language. Modern interest in the old ways has led to a revival of pagan religious practices in the form of Åsatru. The Norwegian Åsatrufellesskapet Bifrost formed in 1996; in 2011, the fellowship had about 300 members. Foreningen Forn Sed was formed in 1999 and has been recognised by the Norwegian government.

The Sámi minority retained their shamanistic religion well into the 18th century, when most converted to Christianity under the influence of Dano-Norwegian Lutheran missionaries. Although some insist that "indigenous Sámi religion had effectively been eradicated,' anthropologist Gutorm Gjessing's Changing Lapps (1954) argues that the Sámi's "were outwardly and to all practical purposes converted to Christianity, but at the subconscious and unconscious level, the shamistic frenzy survived, more or less latent, only awaiting the necessary stimulus to break out into the open." Today there is a renewed appreciation for the Sámi traditional way of life, which has led to a revival of Noaidevuohta. Some Norwegian and Sámi celebrities are reported to visit shamans for guidance.

Health 

Norway was awarded first place according to the UN's Human Development Index (HDI) for 2013. In the 1800s, by contrast, poverty and communicable diseases dominated in Norway together with famines and epidemics. From the 1900s, improvements in public health occurred as a result of development in several areas such as social and living conditions, changes in disease and medical outbreaks, establishment of the health care system, and emphasis on public health matters. Vaccination and increased treatment opportunities with antibiotics resulted in great improvements within the Norwegian population. Improved hygiene and better nutrition were factors that contributed to improved health.

The disease pattern in Norway changed from communicable diseases to non-communicable diseases and chronic diseases as cardiovascular disease. Inequalities and social differences are still present in public health in Norway today.

In 2013 the infant mortality rate was 2.5 per 1,000 live births among children under the age of one. For girls it was 2.7 and for boys 2.3, which is the lowest infant mortality rate for boys ever recorded in Norway.

Education 

Higher education in Norway is offered by a range of seven universities, five specialised colleges, 25 university colleges as well as a range of private colleges. Education follows the Bologna Process involving Bachelor (3 years), Master (2 years) and PhD (3 years) degrees. Acceptance is offered after finishing upper secondary school with general study competence.

Public education is virtually free for citizens from EU/EEA and Switzerland, but other nationalities need to pay tuition fees. Higher education has historically been free for everyone regardless of nationality, but tuition fees for all students from outside EU/EEA and Switzerland was implemented in 2023. 

The academic year has two semesters, from August to December and from January to June. The ultimate responsibility for the education lies with the Norwegian Ministry of Education and Research.

Languages 

Norwegian in its two forms, Bokmål and Nynorsk, is the main national official language of all of Norway. Sámi, a group which includes three separate languages, is recognised as a minority language on the national level and is a co-official language alongside Norwegian in the Sámi administrative linguistic area (Forvaltningsområdet for samisk språk) in Northern Norway. Kven language is a minority language and is a co-official language alongside Norwegian in one municipality, also in Northern Norway.

Norwegian
Norwegian is a North Germanic language descended from Old Norse. It is the main national language of Norway and is spoken throughout the country. Norwegian is spoken natively by over 5 million people mainly in Norway, but is generally understood throughout Scandinavia and to a lesser degree other Nordic countries. It has two official written forms, Bokmål and Nynorsk. Both are used in public administration, schools, churches, and media. Bokmål is the written language used by a large majority of about 85%. Around 95% of the population speak Norwegian as their first or native language, although many speak dialects that may differ significantly from the written languages. All Norwegian dialects are mutually intelligible, although listeners with limited exposure to dialects other than their own may struggle to understand certain phrases and pronunciations in some other dialects.

Norwegian is closely related to and generally mutually intelligible with its neighbour Scandinavian languages; Danish and Swedish, and the three main Scandinavian languages thus form both a dialect continuum and a larger language community with about 25 million speakers. All three languages are commonly employed in communication among inhabitants of the Scandinavian countries. As a result of the co-operation within the Nordic Council, inhabitants of all Nordic countries always have the right to communicate with Norwegian authorities in Danish or Swedish as equal alternatives to Norwegian. In the 19th and 20th centuries, the Norwegian language was subject to strong political and cultural controversies. This led to the development of Nynorsk in the 19th century and to the formation of alternative spelling standards in the 20th century.

Sámi and Kven
Several Uralic Sámi languages, which are related but not generally mutually intelligible, are traditionally spoken by the Sámi people primarily in Northern Norway and to much lesser extent in some parts of Central Norway. Around 15,000 people have officially registered as Sámi in the Sámi census (Samemanntallet), but the number of people of recent Sámi heritage is often estimated at 50,000 people. The number of people who have some knowledge of Northern Sámi, including as a second language, is estimated at 25,000 people, but only a minority are native speakers. The other Sámi languages are heavily endangered and spoken by at most a few hundred people. Most people of Sámi heritage are today native speakers of Norwegian as a result of past assimilation policies. Speakers have a right to be educated and to receive communication from the government in their own language in a special forvaltningsområde (administrative area) for Sámi languages. The Kven minority historically spoke the Uralic Kven language (considered a separate language in Norway, but generally perceived as a Finnish dialect in Finland). Today the majority of ethnic Kven have little or no knowledge of the language. According to the Kainun institutti, "The typical modern Kven is a Norwegian-speaking Norwegian who knows his genealogy." As Norway has ratified the European Charter for Regional or Minority Languages (ECRML) the Kven language together with Romani and Scandoromani language has become officially recognised minority languages.

Other languages
Some supporters have also advocated making Norwegian Sign Language an official language of the country.

Students who are children of immigrant parents are encouraged to learn the Norwegian language. The Norwegian government offers language instructional courses for immigrants wishing to obtain Norwegian citizenship. With increasing concern about assimilating immigrants, since 1 September 2008, the government has required that an applicant for Norwegian citizenship give evidence of proficiency in either Norwegian or in one of the Sámi languages, or give proof of having attended classes in Norwegian for 300 hours, or meet the language requirements for university studies in Norway (that is, by being proficient in one of the Scandinavian languages).

The primary foreign language taught in Norwegian schools is English, considered an international language since the post-WWII era. The majority of the population is fairly fluent in English, especially those born after World War II. German, French and Spanish are also commonly taught as second or, more often, third languages. Russian, Japanese, Italian, Latin, and rarely Chinese (Mandarin) are offered in some schools, mostly in the cities. Traditionally, English, German and French were considered the main foreign languages in Norway. These languages, for instance, were used on Norwegian passports until the 1990s, and university students have a general right to use these languages when submitting their theses.

Culture 

The Norwegian farm culture continues to play a role in contemporary Norwegian culture. In the 19th century, it inspired a strong romantic nationalistic movement, which is still visible in the Norwegian language and media. Norwegian culture blossomed with nationalist efforts to achieve an independent identity in the areas of literature, art and music. This continues today in the performing arts and as a result of government support for exhibitions, cultural projects and artwork.

Cinema 

The Norwegian cinema has received international recognition. The documentary film Kon-Tiki (1950) won an Academy Award. In 1957, Arne Skouen's Nine Lives was nominated, but failed to win. Another notable film is The Pinchcliffe Grand Prix, an animated feature film directed by Ivo Caprino. The film was released in 1975 and is based on characters from Norwegian cartoonist Kjell Aukrust. It is the most widely seen Norwegian film of all time. Nils Gaup's Pathfinder (1987), the story of the Sámi, was nominated for an Oscar. Berit Nesheim's The Other Side of Sunday was nominated for an Oscar in 1997.

Since the 1990s, the film industry has thrived, producing up to 20 feature films each year. Particular successes were Kristin Lavransdatter, based on a novel by a Nobel Prize winner; The Telegraphist and Gurin with the Foxtail. Knut Erik Jensen was among the more successful new directors, together with Erik Skjoldbjærg, who is remembered for Insomnia. Elling and the 2012 adaption of Kon-Tiki was nominated for an Oscar for the best foreign language film. The TV-series Skam created by Julie Andem received a cult following and international recognition, with many countries making their own adaptations of the series.

Norwegian directors such as Joachim Rønning, Anja Breien, Espen Sandberg, Liv Ullmann and Morten Tyldum has made international success with their films and TV series. Which includes movies such as The Imitation Game, Passengers, Pirates of the Caribbean: Salazar's Revenge and Maleficent: Mistress of Evil, as well as the TV-series Jack Ryan and Marco Polo. Composers include Thomas Bergersen, who has composed for many picture campaigns, including Avatar, The Dark Knight, Harry Potter and Narnia. Egil Monn-Iversen has been one of the most influential modern composers in Norway, having composed scores to over 100 Norwegian movies and TV series.

The country has also been used as filming location for several Hollywood and other international productions, including Star Wars The Empire Strikes Back (1980), for which the producers used Hardangerjøkulen glacier as a filming location for scenes of the ice planet Hoth. It included a memorable battle in the snow. Among the thousands of films that have been filmed in Norway include Die Another Day, No Time to Die, The Golden Compass, Spies Like Us, Mission: Impossible – Fallout and Mission: Impossible – Dead Reckoning Part One, Black Widow, Tenet, Harry Potter and the Half-Blood prince and Heroes of Telemark, as well as the TV series Lilyhammer and Vikings also had scenes set in Norway. A short film, The Spirit of Norway, was featured at Maelstrom at Norway Pavilion at Epcot located within Walt Disney World Resort in Florida in the United States. The attraction and the film ceased their operations on 5 October 2014.

Music 

 The classical music of the romantic composers Edvard Grieg, Rikard Nordraak and Johan Svendsen is internationally known, as is the modern music of Arne Nordheim. Norway's classical performers include Leif Ove Andsnes, one of the world's more famous pianists; Truls Mørk, an outstanding cellist; and the great Wagnerian soprano Kirsten Flagstad.

The jazz scene in Norway is thriving. Jan Garbarek, Terje Rypdal, Mari Boine, Arild Andersen and Bugge Wesseltoft are internationally recognised while Paal Nilssen-Love, Supersilent, Jaga Jazzist and Wibutee are becoming world-class artists of the younger generation.

Norway has a strong folk music tradition which remains popular to this day. Among the most prominent folk musicians are Hardanger fiddlers Andrea Een, Olav Jørgen Hegge and Annbjørg Lien, and the vocalists Agnes Buen Garnås, Kirsten Bråten Berg and Odd Nordstoga.
 
Norwegian black metal, a form of rock music in Norway, has been an influence in world music since the late 20th century. Since the 1990s, Norway's export of black metal, a lo-fi, dark and raw form of heavy metal, has been developed by such bands as Emperor, Darkthrone, Gorgoroth, Mayhem, Burzum and Immortal. More recently, bands such as Enslaved, Kvelertak, Dimmu Borgir and Satyricon have evolved the genre into the present day while still garnering worldwide fans. Controversial events associated with the black metal movement in the early 1990s included several church burnings and two prominent murder cases.

Ylvis rose to international stardom with the song What Does the Fox Say?, which received over 1 billion views on YouTube. A-ha initially rose to global fame during the mid-1980s. In the 1990s and 2000s, the group maintained its popularity domestically, and has remained successful outside Norway, especially in Germany, Switzerland, France, and Brazil. A-ha's most memorable song and music video Take On Me has currently over 1.3 billion views

Some of the most memorable female solo artists from Norway are Susanne Sundfør, Sigrid, Astrid S, Adelén, Julie Bergan, Maria Mena, Tone Damli, Margaret Berger, Lene Marlin, Christel Alsos, Maria Arredondo, Marion Raven and Marit Larsen (both former members of the defunct pop-rock group M2M), Lene Nystrøm (vocalist of the Danish eurodance group Aqua) and Anni-Frid Lyngstad (vocalist of the Swedish pop group ABBA). Norwegian songwriters and producers for international artists include Stargate, Espen Lind, Lene Marlin and Ina Wroldsen.

Norway enjoys many music festivals throughout the year, all over the country. Norway is the host of one of the world's biggest extreme sport festivals with music, Ekstremsportveko—a festival held annually in Voss. Oslo is the host of many festivals, such as Øyafestivalen and by:Larm. Oslo used to have a summer parade similar to the German Love Parade. In 1992, the city of Oslo wanted to adopt the French music festival Fête de la Musique. Fredrik Carl Størmer established the festival. Even in its first year, "Musikkens Dag" gathered thousands of people and artists in the streets of Oslo. "Musikkens Dag" is now renamed Musikkfest Oslo.

Literature 

The history of Norwegian literature starts with the pagan Eddaic poems and skaldic verse of the ninth and tenth centuries, with poets such as Bragi Boddason and Eyvindr skáldaspillir. The arrival of Christianity around the year 1000 brought Norway into contact with European medieval learning, hagiography and history writing. Merged with native oral tradition and Icelandic influence, this influenced the literature written in the late 12th and early 13th centuries. Major works of that period include Historia Norwegiæ, Þiðrekssaga and Konungs skuggsjá.

Little Norwegian literature came out of the period of the Scandinavian Union and the subsequent Dano-Norwegian union (1387–1814), with some notable exceptions such as Petter Dass and Ludvig Holberg. In his play Peer Gynt, Ibsen characterised this period as "Twice two hundred years of darkness/brooded o'er the race of monkeys." The first line of this couplet is frequently quoted. During the union with Denmark, the government imposed using only written Danish, which decreased the writing of Norwegian literature.

Two major events precipitated a major resurgence in Norwegian literature: in 1811 a Norwegian university was established in Christiania. Secondly, seized by the spirit of revolution following the American and French revolutions, the Norwegians created their first Constitution in 1814. Strong authors were inspired who became recognised first in Scandinavia, and then worldwide; among them were Henrik Wergeland, Peter Christen Asbjørnsen, Jørgen Moe and Camilla Collett.

By the late 19th century, in the Golden Age of Norwegian literature, the so-called "Great Four" emerged: Henrik Ibsen, Bjørnstjerne Bjørnson, Alexander Kielland, and Jonas Lie. Bjørnson's "peasant novels", such as Ein glad gut (A Happy Boy) and Synnøve Solbakken, are typical of the Norwegian romantic nationalism of their day. Kielland's novels and short stories are mostly naturalistic. Although an important contributor to early romantic nationalism, (especially Peer Gynt), Henrik Ibsen is better known for his pioneering realistic dramas such as The Wild Duck and A Doll's House. They caused an uproar because of his candid portrayals of the middle classes, complete with infidelity, unhappy marriages, and corrupt businessmen.

In the 20th century, three Norwegian novelists were awarded the Nobel Prize in Literature: Bjørnstjerne Bjørnson in 1903, Knut Hamsun for the book Markens grøde ("Growth of the Soil") in 1920, and Sigrid Undset (known for Kristinlavransdatter) in 1928. Writers such as the following also made important contributions: Dag Solstad, Jon Fosse, Cora Sandel, Olav Duun, Olav H. Hauge, Gunvor Hofmo, Stein Mehren, Kjell Askildsen, Hans Herbjørnsrud, Aksel Sandemose, Bergljot Hobæk Haff, Jostein Gaarder, Erik Fosnes Hansen, Jens Bjørneboe, Kjartan Fløgstad, Lars Saabye Christensen, Johan Borgen, Herbjørg Wassmo, Jan Erik Vold, Rolf Jacobsen, Olaf Bull, Jan Kjærstad, Georg Johannesen, Tarjei Vesaas, Sigurd Hoel, Arnulf Øverland, Karl Ove Knausgård and Johan Falkberget.

Architecture 

With expansive forests, Norway has long had a tradition of building in wood. Many of today's most interesting new buildings are made of wood, reflecting the strong appeal that this material continues to hold for Norwegian designers and builders.

With Norway's conversion to Christianity some 1,000 years ago, churches were built. Stonework architecture was introduced from Europe for the most important structures, beginning with the construction of Nidaros Cathedral in Trondheim. In the early Middle Ages, wooden stave churches were constructed throughout Norway. Some of them have survived; they represent Norway's most unusual contribution to architectural history. A fine example, Urnes Stave Church in inner Sognefjord, is on UNESCO's World Heritage List. Another notable example of wooden architecture is the buildings at Bryggen Wharf in Bergen, also on the list for World Cultural Heritage sites, consisting of a row of tall, narrow wooden structures along the quayside.

In the 17th century, under the Danish monarchy, cities and villages such as Kongsberg and Røros were established. The city Kongsberg had a church built in the Baroque style. Traditional wooden buildings that were constructed in Røros have survived.

After Norway's union with Denmark was dissolved in 1814, Oslo became the capital. The architect Christian H. Grosch designed the earliest parts of the University of Oslo, the Oslo Stock Exchange, and many other buildings and churches constructed in that early national period.

At the beginning of the 20th century, the city of Ålesund was rebuilt in the Art Nouveau style, influenced by styles of France. The 1930s, when functionalism dominated, became a strong period for Norwegian architecture. It is only since the late 20th century that Norwegian architects have achieved international renown. One of the most striking modern buildings in Norway is the Sámi Parliament in Kárášjohka, designed by Stein Halvorson and Christian Sundby. Its debating chamber, in timber, is an abstract version of a lavvo, the traditional tent used by the nomadic Sámi people.

Art 

For an extended period, the Norwegian art scene was dominated by artwork from Germany and Holland as well as by the influence of Copenhagen. It was in the 19th century that a truly Norwegian era began, first with portraits, later with impressive landscapes. Johan Christian Dahl (1788–1857), originally from the Dresden school, eventually returned to paint the landscapes of western Norway, defining Norwegian painting for the first time."

Norway's newly found independence from Denmark encouraged painters to develop their Norwegian identity, especially with landscape painting by artists such as Kitty Kielland, a female painter who studied under Hans Gude, and Harriet Backer, another pioneer among female artists, influenced by impressionism. Frits Thaulow, an impressionist, was influenced by the art scene in Paris as was Christian Krohg, a realist painter, famous for his paintings of prostitutes.

Of particular note is Edvard Munch, a symbolist/expressionist painter who became world-famous for The Scream which is said to represent the anxiety of modern man. Other notable works from Munch includes The Sick Child, Madonna and Puberty.

Other artists of note include Harald Sohlberg, a neo-romantic painter remembered for his paintings of Røros, and Odd Nerdrum, a figurative painter who maintains that his work is not art, but kitsch.

Cuisine 

Norway's culinary traditions show the influence of long seafaring and farming traditions, with salmon (fresh and cured), herring (pickled or marinated), trout, codfish, and other seafood, balanced by cheeses (such as brunost, Jarlsberg cheese, and gamalost), dairy products, and breads (predominantly dark/darker).

Lefse is a Norwegian potato flatbread, usually topped with large amounts of butter and sugar, most commonly eaten around Christmas. Traditional Norwegian dishes include lutefisk, smalahove, pinnekjøtt, raspeball, and fårikål. A Norwegian speciality is rakefisk, which is fermented trout, consumed with thin flatbread (flatbrød, not lefse) and sour cream. The most popular pastry is vaffel; it is different from the Belgian vaffel in taste and consistency and is served with sour cream, brown cheese, butter and sugar, or strawberry or raspberry jam, which can all be mixed or eaten separately.

Sports 

Sports are a central part of Norwegian culture, and popular sports include association football, handball, biathlon, cross-country skiing, ski jumping, speed skating, and, to a lesser degree, ice hockey.

Association football is the most popular sport in Norway in terms of active membership. In 2014–2015 polling, football ranked far behind biathlon and cross-country skiing in terms of popularity as spectator sports. Ice hockey is the biggest indoor sport. The women's handball national team has won several titles, including two Summer Olympics championships (2008, 2012), three World Championships (1999, 2011, 2015), and six European Championship (1998, 2004, 2006, 2008, 2010, 2014).

In association football, the women's national team has won the FIFA Women's World Cup in 1995 and the Olympic Football Tournament in 2000. The women's team also has two UEFA European Women's Championship titles (1987, 1993). The men's national football team has participated three times in the FIFA World Cup (1938, 1994, and 1998), and once in the European Championship (2000). The highest FIFA ranking Norway has achieved is second, a position it has held twice, in 1993 and in 1995.

Norwegian players in the National Football League include Halvor Hagen, Bill Irgens, Leif Olve Dolonen Larsen, Mike Mock, and Jan Stenerud.

Bandy is a traditional sport in Norway and the country is one of the four founders of Federation of International Bandy. In terms of licensed athletes, it is the second biggest winter sport in the world. As of January 2018, the men's national team has captured one silver and one bronze, while the women's national team has managed five bronzes at the World Championships.

Norway first participated at the Olympic Games in 1900, and has sent athletes to compete in every Games since then, except for the sparsely attended 1904 Games and the 1980 Summer Olympics in Moscow when they participated in the American-led boycott. Norway leads the overall medal tables at the Winter Olympic Games by a considerable margin. 
Norway has hosted the Games on two occasions:
 1952 Winter Olympics in Oslo
 1994 Winter Olympics in Lillehammer
It also hosted the 2016 Winter Youth Olympics in Lillehammer, making Norway the first country to host both Winter regular and Youth Olympics.

Norway featured a women's national team in beach volleyball that competed at the 2018–2020 CEV Beach Volleyball Continental Cup.

Chess has gained huge popularity in Norway. Magnus Carlsen, a Norwegian is the current five-time world champion.

See also 

 Outline of Norway

Notes

References

Citations

Sources

External links 

 regjeringen.no, official Norwegian government website
 Norway.no, Norway's official portal
 
 Statistics Norway
 State of the Environment Norway
 Norway. The World Factbook. Central Intelligence Agency.
 Norway entry at Britannica.com
 
 
 
 Norway from UCB Libraries GovPubs
 Norway profile from the BBC News
 Norway.info, official foreign portal of the Norwegian Ministry of Foreign Affairs
 
 
 Official facts about Norway
 VisitNorway.com, official travel guide to Norway.
 
 Key Development Forecasts for Norway from International Futures
 World Bank Summary Trade Statistics Norway

Northwestern European countries
Member states of the United Nations
Member states of the Council of Europe
Member states of NATO
Members of the Nordic Council
Member states of the European Free Trade Association
Scandinavian countries
States and territories established in the 870s
872 establishments
States and territories established in 1814
States and territories established in 1905
Countries in Europe
 
Countries of Europe with multiple official languages
OECD members